Events from the year 1718 in Ireland.

Incumbent
Monarch: George I

Events
May 2 – the scholar William Nicolson is appointed Bishop of Derry.
May 10 – the Roman Catholic Bishopric of Emly is united with the Archbishopric of Cashel.
July–August – the first ships carrying Scotch-Irish emigrants from Ulster to North America arrive in Boston, Massachusetts.
October 28 – Ashkenazi Jews lease the site for Ballybough Cemetery in Fairview, Dublin, Ireland's first Jewish cemetery.
Jervis Street Hospital, is founded by six surgeons as the Charitable Infirmary in Cook Street, the first public voluntary hospital in the British Isles.

Births

March 2 – John Gore, 1st Baron Annaly, politician and peer (d. 1784)
Nano Nagle, founder of the Presentation Sisters (d. 1784)

Deaths
October 24 – Thomas Parnell, clergyman and poet (b. 1679)
1716 or 1718 – Ruaidhrí Ó Flaithbheartaigh, historian (b. 1629)

References

 
Years of the 18th century in Ireland
Ireland
1710s in Ireland